Bambridge is a surname, and may refer to:

Arthur Bambridge (1861–1923), England international footballer
Charles Bambridge (1858–1935), England international footballer and captain
Chris Bambridge (born 7 October 1947), Australian association football referee
Ernest Bambridge (1848–1917), England international footballer
George Bambridge (1892–1943), husband of Elsie Kipling, daughter of Rudyard Kipling
Thomas Bambridge (d. c. 1750), warden of Fleet Prison in England
William Samuel Bambridge (1820–1879), missionary in Waimate, New Zealand and photographer to Queen Victoria
 Willy Bambridge (1911–1953), French footballer born in Papeete, Tahiti
 Edwin Elijah Bambridge (1815–1879), a pioneer of the Australian Capital Territory who planted some of the first willow trees along the Molonglo River.
 Anthony Bambridge (1937–1997) Managing Editor The Sunday Times. co-author "Ambush"

External links
The Bambridge Family History Pages
Bambridge Family Crest and Name History